Katlicherra Assembly constituency is one of the 126 constituencies of the Legislative Assembly of Assam state in northeastern India.

Katlicherra (constituency number 7) is one of the 3 constituencies located in Hailakandi district. Katlicherra is part of Karimganj Lok Sabha constituency along with 7 other assembly segments, namely, Hailakandi and Algapur in Hailakandi district, and Patharkandi, Karimganj North, Karimganj South, Ratabari and Badarpur in Karimganj district.

Members of Legislative Assembly

Election results

2021 Result

References

External links 
 

Assembly constituencies of Assam